Gravette  is a city in Benton County, Arkansas, United States. The population is 3,547 according to the 2020 census. The population was 2,325 at the 2010 census. It is part of the Northwest Arkansas region.

Geography
Gravette is located in northwestern Benton County, Arkansas at  (36.419962, -94.452584).

In 2012, the nearby unincorporated community of Hiwasse was facing annexation by the city of Bella Vista. The majority of people within Hiwasse were opposed and chose to be annexed by Gravette instead.

Several major highways and interstates run through Gravette, including Arkansas highways 72, 59, and 279 and Interstate 49 which has several exits in Gravette.

Early history

The original name of the first European-American settlement at this location was Nebo. The Nebo area is now referred to as Old Town in Chalk Valley and was the earliest pioneer settlement of the community. The settlement was platted in the 1870s by Joseph P. Covey, who relocated to Southwest City, Missouri, in 1881. Ellis Tillman Gravett opened the Chalk Valley Distillery in Nebo and was also the proprietor of a general merchandise store. In 1891, he moved that store west out of the valley to what is now downtown Gravette. Gravette was incorporated on January 27, 1899. By 1910 the population of Gravette amounted to 569.

Demographics

2020 census

As of the 2020 United States census, there were 3,547 people, 1,305 households, and 884 families residing in the city.

2010 census
As of 2010 Gravette had a population of 2,325, with an estimated 1,418 housing units with a majority being occupied. The median household income is estimated at $46,275. Approximately 16.3% of the population has obtained a bachelor's degree or higher.. The racial and ethnic composition of the population was 87.8% non-Hispanic white, 0.6% black or African American, 3.5% Native American, 0.7% Asian, 4.1% from two or more races and 4.0% Hispanic or Latino.

2000 census
As of the census of 2000, there were 1,810 people, 697 households, and 471 families residing in the city. The racial makeup of the city was 92.87% White, 0.17% Black or African American, 2.10% Native American, 0.61% Asian, 1.05% from other races, and 3.20% from two or more races.  2.93% of the population were Hispanic or Latino of any race.

There were 697 households, out of which 37.2% had children under the age of 18 living with them, 49.5% were married couples living together, 14.5% had a female householder with no husband present, and 32.4% were non-families. 28.3% of all households were made up of individuals, and 16.2% had someone living alone who was 65 years of age or older.  The average household size was 2.48 and the average family size was 3.07.

In the city, the population was spread out, with 29.2% under the age of 18, 8.3% from 18 to 24, 27.0% from 25 to 44, 18.0% from 45 to 64, and 17.6% who were 65 years of age or older.  The median age was 36 years. For every 100 females, there were 87.0 males.  For every 100 females age 18 and over, there were 82.9 males.

The median income for a household in the city was $29,881, and the median income for a family was $34,844. Males had a median income of $28,571 versus $18,906 for females. The per capita income for the city was $15,241.  About 11.5% of families and 16.6% of the population were below the poverty line, including 22.5% of those under age 18 and 19.3% of those age 65 or over.

Economy 
R & R Solutions, a packaging and logistics company is one of the largest employers in Gravette. Two plastics production companies, Hendren Plastics and Insul-Bead, are located in Gravette and produce a variety of products, most notably dock floatation devices that are shipped nationwide.

Healthcare 
Ozarks Community Hospital is headquartered in Gravette and has a hospital and healthcare clinic in town.

The Gravette Fire Department runs an ALS ambulance service in the city limits. The department is staffed full-time with paramedics and EMTs.

Education 
Public education in the majority of Gravette is provided by the Gravette School District, which operates Gravette High School. A small section of Gravette to the east is in the Bentonville School District.

School zoning for the Bentonville section is as follows: Thomas Jefferson Elementary School, Divided between Old High Middle School and Ruth Barker Middle School, Lincoln Junior High School, and Bentonville High School.

Parks and Trail System 
Gravette has eight parks throughout the city and two walk-bike trails. The city has three community buildings.

Old Town Park features a playground, 9-hole disc golf course, large pavilion, and a shaded, fenced playground area specifically for toddlers. The farmer's market is a seasonal attraction that sets up at Old Town Park and features locally grown produce, meats, and goods. The Gravette skate park is a small skate park adjacent to Pop Allum Park and features quarter-pipes, hand rails, and a fun box. The pool and splash park is a seasonal attraction that features a large swimming pool with slide, and 3,000 square foot splash park with water spouts, splash buckets, spraying water, and small water slides. Hiwasse Park has a fire station themed playground, 1/4-mile concrete walking trail, full-size basketball court, full-size tennis court, and large green space. There is also a pavilion and restrooms. Centennial Park is home to several permanent food trucks. It features a train caboose that was donated to the city by Kansas City Southern. Kindley Park, named after Field E. Kindley, is near downtown Gravette. It has a half-court basketball court, a half-court tennis court, two playgrounds, a pavilion, and a T-33 aircraft on loan from the National Museum of the U.S. Air Force. Pop Allum Park has seven baseball fields and four soccer fields of varying sizes. There is a small playground. On the south end of the park lies the Gravette nature trail. The Gravette dog park is near downtown Gravette and features separate areas for large and small dogs.

Notable people
Lloyd Andrews, Western actor and host of children's TV shows
Richard "Bigo" Barnett (Protestor), infamous criminal who took part in the January 6 attack on the US Capitol.
Jim Hendren, current Arkansas state senator
Field Eugene Kindley, aviator and World War I flying ace
Tommy Morrison, world heavyweight champion
Arnold Murray, pastor and TV evangelist (1929–2014)
Gene Stephens, former Major League Baseball player
Mary Lou Slinkard, current Arkansas state representative

Climate
The climate in this area is characterized by hot, humid summers and generally mild to cool winters.  According to the Köppen Climate Classification system, Gravette has a humid subtropical climate, abbreviated "Cfa" on climate maps. Gravette is the site of the coldest recorded temperature in Arkansas: -29 °F (-34 °C) on February 13, 1905.

According weather data tallied between July 1, 1985 and June 30, 2015 for every location in the National Oceanic and Atmospheric Administration's official climate database, Gravette, Arkansas, is the snowiest place in the state of Arkansas with an average of 16 inches of snow per year.

References

External links
City of Gravette official website 

Cities in Benton County, Arkansas
Cities in Arkansas
Northwest Arkansas
Populated places established in 1899
1899 establishments in Arkansas